Abiyote Abate (Amharic: አብዮተ አባቴ; born 20 November 1980 in Addis Ababa) is an Ethiopian long-distance runner who specialized in the 3000 and 5000 metres. He has not competed on top level since 2005.

International competitions

Personal bests
 3000 metres – 7:32.38 min (2001)
 5000 metres – 13:00.36 min (2001)
 10,000 metres – 27:45.56 min (2005)

References
 

1980 births
Living people
Athletes from Addis Ababa
Ethiopian male long-distance runners
World Athletics Championships athletes for Ethiopia
21st-century Ethiopian people